Stronghold is a 1951 American-Mexican Western historical film directed by Steve Sekely and starring Veronica Lake, Zachary Scott and Arturo de Córdova. A separate Spanish version Red Fury was also made. The cost of both films was $519,000.

Plot
In 1865, Señora Stevens and her American daughter Maria leave the US to return to Stevens' homeland of Mexico along with their servant Caesar. Both Maria's father and brother were killed in the US Civil War (the father fighting for the South, the brother for the North), and they hope to live peacefully under Emperor Maximilian.

Maria, her mother and Cesar are kidnapped by the bandit Ignacio López as soon as they land. Señora Stevens fakes a collapse, which allows Caesar to attack Lopez and the women to escape.

They arrive at an estate belonging to Don Pedro Álvarez, the son of an old friend of Senora Stevens. Nacho arrives with Caesar and it is revealed that Alvarez is an ally of Benito Juárez who is leading the fight against Maximilian.

Pedro sends Señora Stevens to Taxco but keeps Maria hostage until he receives a load of silver he can trade for supplies.

Eventually the silver arrives along with Maria's maid Lupe who gives her a note from Don Navarro asking her to bring Pedro with her when she is released.

Pedro agrees to go with her to Taxco. On the way he shows Maria some of the suffering caused under Maximilian and she becomes more sympathetic to his plight.

Navarro's men attack Pedro but are ambushed by Pedro's troops and Pedro escapes.

In Taxco, Navarro invites Maria to a ball. On the way Pedro abducts Maria briefly, but Navarro recaptures her.

Maria meets Maximilian and Carlotta and asks them to help the poor. Lupe tells Maria that her mother has died. The empress secretly instructs her guards to send men to Taxco to hang Pedro, so that Maria will marry Navarro and Navarro will get the Stevens' money.

Pedro is arrested at Senora Stevens' funeral. He manages to escape but Navarro orders the cavern blown up trying to catch them. This threatens the lives of numerous mine workers.

Pedro is about to be hanged when peasants show up to rescue him. The revolution against Maximilian begins.

Cast
 Veronica Lake as Mary Stevens  
 Zachary Scott as Don Miguel Navarro 
 Rita Macedo as Beatriz Vega
 Arturo de Córdova as Don Pedro Alvarez 
 Alfonso Bedoya as Ignacio "Nacho" López
 Yadira Jiménez as Lupe
 Fanny Schiller as Señora Stevens
 Gilberto González as José Vega
 Carlos Múzquiz as Diego Sánchez
 Frederick A. Mack as Caesar
 Roc Galván as Gustavo Rojo
 Gustavo Rojo
 Iren Agay as Empress Carlotta
 Felipe De Alba as Emperor Maximilian

Production
The film was Zachary Scott's first after he finished his contract with Warner Bros. It was financed by Filmadora Studios, a Mexican company.

Filming started in April 1950 at Churubusco Studios in Mexico City. Filming was complete by June.

In the Spanish version titled Red Fury, Sarita Montiel played María, Emilia Guiú played Beatriz Vega, Carlos López Moctezuma played Don Miguel Navarro and Juan José Laboriel played Caesar. Many of the supporting actors appeared in both versions. Gustavo Rojo is billed in the English version but did not appear as his character was eliminated.

Reception
The Monthly Film Bulletin called it "shoddy" with "none of the qualities one expects of Mexican productions. Little use is made of the natural beauties or the local inhabitants... Hard to follow and unconvincing".

Diabolique called it "a film that has a good story buried underneath confused execution. Lake is wooden but at least looks fine. That was her last Hollywood-ish movie."

Lawsuit
Rights to the film transferred to Nacional Financiera SA, a Mexican government-controlled corporation. In 1962 a lawsuit was filed against that company claiming unpaid salaries of $142,375 plus interest; the claimants included Veronica Lake, Zachary Scott, Stanley Cortez, Steve Sekeley, and Wells Root. $13,628 had been paid to the claimants in 1956 and 1958; the defendant said this amount represented payment in full. Lake's original claim was for $47,500.

References

Bibliography 
 Ronald L. Davis. Zachary Scott: Hollywood's Sophisticated Cad. Univ. Press of Mississippi, 2009.

External links 
 
 
 
 Review of film at Variety

1951 films
1951 Western (genre) films
1950s historical films
1950s multilingual films
American Western (genre) films
American black-and-white films
American historical films
American multilingual films
1950s English-language films
English-language Mexican films
Films directed by Steve Sekely
Lippert Pictures films
Mexican Western (genre) films
Mexican black-and-white films
Mexican historical films
Mexican multilingual films
Second French intervention in Mexico films
1950s American films
1950s Mexican films